Mauritania Airways S.A. was an airline based in Nouakchott, Mauritania, operating out of Nouakchott International Airport.

History
The company was established in December 2006, but made its first flight only on 7 November 2007. It replaced Air Mauritanie, the former national airline, which had suffered from prolonged financial difficulties and had been liquidated in October of the same year. Mauritania Airways was a joint venture between Mauritanian and Tunisian interests: Tunisair owned 51 percent, Mauritanian businessman Mohamed Ould Bouamatou owned 39 percent, and the Government of Mauritania owned the remaining 10 percent.

In November 2010, the airline was banned from European airspace by the European Commission, quoting "persisting deficiencies in its operations and maintenance", thus losing the rights to continue its scheduled services to Paris-Orly Airport, France and Gran Canaria Airport, Spain. Subsequently, Mauritania Airways discontinued all flights and went out of service on 23 December 2010. Again, a new Mauritanian flag carrier was formed, this time called Mauritania Airlines International; this airline was subsequently announced in the April 2012 European Commission press release (19th update) as having been added to the European list of banned air carriers.

Destinations

As of January 2010, Mauritania Airways offered scheduled flights to the following destinations:
Africa
Benin
Cotonou – Cadjehoun Airport
Cape Verde
Praia – Praia Airport
Côte d'Ivoire
Abidjan – Port Bouet Airport
The Gambia
Banjul – Banjul International Airport
Mali
 Bamako – Senou International Airport
Mauritania
Nouakchott – Nouakchott International Airport hub
Nouadhibou – Nouadhibou International Airport
Niger
Niamey – Niamey Airport
Republic of the Congo
Brazzaville – Maya-Maya Airport
Senegal
Dakar – Dakar-Yoff-Léopold Sédar Senghor International Airport
Ziguinchor – Ziguinchor Airport
Tunisia
Tunis – Tunis-Carthage International Airport

Europe (flights were suspended following the EU ban)
France
Paris – Paris-Orly Airport
Spain
Las Palmas – Gran Canaria Airport

Fleet
Upon its closure in December 2010, the Mauritania Airways fleet consisted of the following aircraft:

Incidents
On 28 July 2010 at 01:30 local time, Mauritania Airways Flight 620 from Dakar, Senegal to Conakry, Guinea, which was operated using a Boeing 737-700 (registered TS-IEA), overran the runway upon landing in heavy rain at Conakry International Airport. Approximately 10 persons amongst the 91 passengers and six crew members on board suffered injuries, but there were no fatalities, even though the aircraft was substantially damaged and declared a hull loss; the first of a Boeing 737-700.

References

External links
Official website (defunct)

Defunct airlines of Mauritania
Airlines established in 2006
Airlines disestablished in 2010